Józef Stępkowski (born 13 April 1970 in Ząbkowice Śląskie) is a Polish politician. He was elected to the Sejm on 25 September 2005, getting 8,714 votes in 21 Opole district as a candidate from Samoobrona Rzeczpospolitej Polskiej list. Since 2016, he's a chairman of the stud farm in Prudnik.

See also
Members of Polish Sejm 2005-2007

References

External links
Józef Stępkowski - parliamentary page - includes declarations of interest, voting record, and transcripts of speeches.

1970 births
Living people
People from Ząbkowice Śląskie
Members of the Polish Sejm 2005–2007
Self-Defence of the Republic of Poland politicians